"Feel It" is a song by American hip hop group Three 6 Mafia. It features Tiësto, Sean Kingston and Flo Rida and was produced by Tiësto and DJ Frank E, co-written by Bei Maejor and mixed by Greg Wells. The song was released on December 1, 2009. The song debuted at number 65 on the Canadian Hot 100 and reached number 33 on the next week. The song debuted at number 78 on the Billboard Hot 100.

Music video
On October 9, 2009, Three 6 Mafia shot the video for "Feel It" at The Bank club at Bellagio in Las Vegas. Parts of it were also filmed along the Las Vegas Strip. The music video premiered on Tiësto's Official YouTube Channel on November 13, 2009. Although Flo Rida's verse is included, he does not appear in the music video. It was directed and edited by Rich Newey. The music video has been viewed over 55 million times on YouTube.
The video version of the song differs slightly from the single that was released online, as there is more of a background beat as well as an additional verse from Juicy J, which was not included on the leaked version. The order of appearance also differs in the video, which starts with Juicy J, DJ Paul then Flo Rida (with Sean Kingston doing the chorus); whereas in the leaked single, the order is Flo Rida then DJ Paul, with Sean Kingston again doing the chorus.

Charts
On the week ending March 20, 2010, "Feel It" debuted at number 78 on the Billboard Hot 100.

References

2009 singles
Three 6 Mafia songs
Tiësto songs
Flo Rida songs
Sean Kingston songs
Songs written by Maejor
Songs written by DJ Paul
Songs written by Flo Rida
Songs written by DJ Frank E
Songs written by Juicy J
Songs written by Tiësto
2009 songs